New Taipei Municipal Jui-Fang Industrial High School is a professional school located in New Taipei City of Taiwan. The industrial high school's address is at No.60, Ruifang St., Ruifang District., New Taipei City 22441, Taiwan. It is colloquially known as JFVS. The school was founded in 1934, the area of the main campus is 4.4273 hectares. The current principal is Mr. Ching-Nan, Lin.

School history
1930s

In 1934	
In February 1934, the school turned the first page of its history. Mr. Hatta Yoichi, served as a water conservancy technician by Japanese government, and Mr. Nishimura, and Mr.Cao collaboratively founded the school. The school was named as Legal Foundation of Civil Survey Technician Training Center. The effort has been a foundation stone of modern industry in Taiwan. The Principal was Mr. Nishimura.

In 1936	
The school borrowed classrooms from Cheng -Yuan High School to study (C.Y.H.S only had Evening Division at that time)

In 1939	
In August, the full name of the school was switched to Private School of Civil Survey

1940s

In 1941	
A Legal Foundation purchased a territory to build schoolhouses in San-Chong-Pu (now San-Chong), Taipei County

In 1944	
The schoolhouses began to operate after the completion of the constructions

In 1945	
Before Mr. Nishimura returned to Japan, Mr Cih-Wu, Cao was commissioned to manage the school. Consequently, Mr. Cao was the first-term principal of the school in the era of Taiwan Restoration

In 1946
In May, Mr. Jhong-Sian, Lin, a Taipei County Counselor, promote a reorganization proposal to switch the name of the school into San-Chong Industrial Vocation Junior High School in Taipei County. Meanwhile, the proposal had been approved by the Taipei Parliament.

In 1948	
In May, the school moved from San-Chong to Rui-Fang, Taipei County, therefore, the full name of the school had to be switched from the original into Rui-Fang Industrial Vocational Junior High School in Taipei County.
In spite of the Dept. of Civil, the school had added the Dept.of Mining Engineering.
Principal Cao remained in the post of the school.

1950s

In 1953
In November, Mr. Jyun-Huai Chen was inaugurated as a principal of the school

In 1954
In September, the school had been approved to prepare for the Dept. of Civil at Senior High Level

In 1955
The school began to establish a Senior High Level Division. Meanwhile, the full name of the school had to be switched into Rui-Fang Industrial Vocational School in Taipei County

In 1956
In September, Mr. Guo-Jheng, Wang was inaugurated as a principal of the school

In 1958
In September, the establishment of the Department of Mining Engineering at Senior High Level

In 1959
In September, the suspension of the Dept. of Mining Engineering at Junior High Level

1960s

In 1961
In September, school founded the Dept. of Drafting in Senior High level

In 1963
In August, Principal Guo-Jhong, Wang was changed over the post. The Director of Academic Affair Office, Shao-Jhong, Lin, was in charge of administrative affairs as a representative of the principal

In 1964
Mr. Shao-Jhong, Lin was successful to be to the first principal of Provincial Rui-Fang Industrial Vocational High School. Moreover, because of the governmental fiscal deficiency, school was unable to augment instructional apparatus and to broaden the scope of the campus (the range of the campus was less than one hectare at that time)
Thus, Principal Shao-Jhong Lin had independently struggled to raise funds. After that, the expansion construction project began to flatten the hill in the South, and the soil was refilled to the low-lying ground in the North (now sport field and machinery working factory). Hence, the range of campus extends four hectares wide.

In 1965
The augmentation of the Dept. of Machinery Engineering, Electronics and Electronic Engineering. Also, the Dept. of Civil was switched into the Dept. of Architecture and Civil Survey; the Dept. of Mining Engineering was switched into Mining

In 1969
The division of the Dept. of Drafting into the Dept. of Constructional Drafting and Mechanical Drafting

In 1970
In June, Ministry of Finance had contacted a loan proposal with World Bank (WB) in Washington, DC. The allotment from WB was up to US$1,164,000 (equal to 44,143,261 NTD). The total outlay includes two portions – mechanical apparatuses and building constructions. Further, the constructional tenders and purchase of foreign equipment were supervised under the MoE, WB Loan Division. The efforts contributed to become the most well-equipped industrial school among province-wide
In August, the augmentation of the Dept. of Casting and the Cooperative Education Program

1970s

In 1973
The Dept. of Mining was switched into Mining Material(Metal Industry division). Meanwhile, the establishment of the Evening School due to the regional demands

In 1975
In February, Mr. Yan-Wun, Yu was succeeded to Principal of the school

In 1979
On 28 April, the establishment of alumni club,
On 1 May, the assembly of alumni members

1980s

In 1983
In August, Mr. Yan-Wun, Yu was transferred to Yi-Lan College of Agriculture( now NIU). Then, Mr. Yue, Wang was succeeded to Principal of the school

In 1984
In July, suspension of the Dept. of Mining Engineering because of the gradual diminishment of mining industry in Rui-Fang
In 1985
In August, the Evening Classes cooperated with Bureau of Employment and Vocational Training to implement skill-orientated extended education classes

In 1986
According to curricula reformation, the curricula would be divided into three groups:
1. Construction Group: Dept. of Architecture, Civil Survey, and Constructional Drafting
2. Electronic Group:Dept. of Electricals and Electronics
3. Mechanical Group: Dept. of Casting, Machinery and
Mechanical Drafting

In 1990
In February, Mr. Tian-Fu, Guan was inaugurated as a principal in the school

1990s

In 1993
In February, Mr. Ming-Sin, Lian appeared in the inauguration of a principal in the school

In 1994
In August, the augmentation of Extensional Program of Compulsory Education in the evening school

In 1995
In August, the augmentation of the Practical Education Program

In 1998
In September, the suspension of the Cooperative Education Program

In 1999
In February, the completion of the Internet service
In September, the practice of academically credit system commencing with the first-year students

2000s

In 2000
In February, the school was reorganized into National Jui-Fang Industrial Vocational School due to the needs of provincial abridgment
In August, Principle Ming-Sin, Lian was changed over the post to NKLCIVS, and the representative director of the Academic Affair was Mr. Jin-Cheng, Jhan
In September, the suspension of the Dept. of Constructional Drafting and establishment of the Dept. of Information due to social changes. Meanwhile, the adoption of the registration -orientated admission policy from this academic year
In December, formation of the retired staffs and faculties association

In 2001
In February, Principal Mao – Hsiung, Tsu from National Chen-Kung Vocational High School, Tai-Tung, was inaugurated as Principal in the school. Due to the social reformation, Principle Tus brought a perspective and directions to positively promote the administrative affairs.

In 2002
In September, the Dept. of Mechanical Drafting was changed the name to Dept. of Drafting, and Dep. Civil Survey was changed the name to Dept. of Survey.
The school commenced preparing for the Curricula of Comprehensive High School

In 2003	
In August, enrollment of the Comprehensive High School with five classes

In 2004
In January, the approval to construct the Comprehensive Building, the total expenditure was up to 109 million

In 2005
In May, contracted with China University of Technology as an educational partnership

In 2006
On 1 May, contracted with Chung-Yu Institute of Technology as an educational partnership

In 2007
On 1 July, obtained educational subvention of SAP from MoE

In 2009
In August, the inauguration of the Principal for Mr. Ching-Nan, Lin

School Introduction

Established in 1934 by the Taiwan governor-appointed civil engineers Yoichi Hatta and Nishimura Nisaburo along with local educators Tsao Tzu-Wu and Lin Hsiung-Yang, the "Civil Engineering Surveyor Incubation Center" became the predecessor of the present day school.

Mr. Lin Ching-Nan, the incumbent principal of Jui-Fang Industrial High School, became the head of the institute in 2009. Under his leadership, the school has passed several accreditations and assessments.

External links

New Taipei Municipal Jui-Fang Industrial High School website

High schools in Taiwan